The Soap Myth is a play by American playwright Jeff Cohen. It dramatizes the conflict between Holocaust scholars and historians who require documentary proof when determining the history of the Holocaust and survivors of the Holocaust who were eyewitnesses to the horrors and atrocities.  The play tackles the larger question - relevant to these times - of who has the right to determine the truth, who has the right to write history.  The play also grapples with the scourge of antisemitism and the desecration of Holocaust denial.

Production history
The play was originally developed in a workshop run in July 2009 at the Dog Run Repertory Company. That workshop was directed by Larissa Lury with a cast that included Katia Asche, Victor Barbella, Aaron Costa-Ganis, Louise Flaningam and Joel Friedman. A new, rewritten version had a brief run in the Spring of 2012 Off Broadway at The Roundabout Theater's Harold and Mimi Steinberg Theatre Center. The cast was Greg Mullavey, Andi Potamkin, Dee Pelletier and Donald Corren under the direction of Arnold Mittlelman.

On May 2, 2016, The Soap Myth was presented as a reading at the Bruno Walter Auditorium at the Lincoln Center Library for the Performing Arts.  The reading starred legendary 7-time Emmy Award winning actor Ed Asner and 2-time Tony Award nominee Jayne Atkinson along with Blair Baker and Donald Corren.  The reading, produced by Burke-Cohen Entertainment, was the flagship event of Remembrance Readings, a national program in honor of Holocaust Memorial Day presented by the National Jewish Theater Foundation.

During the week of February 21, 2017, "The Soap Myth" had 5 West Coast readings: @ Marin Academy and Marin Theater Company (San Francisco), @ Shomrei Torah Synagogue in West Hills (LA), University Synagogue in Irvine and at Center Theatre Group's Kirk Douglas Theatre in Culver City (LA).  The cast was Ed Asner, Tovah Feldshuh, Blair Baker and Donald Corren under the direction of Pam Berlin.

From January 22 to February 1, 2018, The Soap Myth reading enjoyed a brief tour that included the Adrienne Arsht Center for the Performing Arts in Miami Beach, FL, the Adolph and Rose Levis Jewish Community Center in Boca Raton, FL, the Parker Playhouse in Fort Lauderdale, FL, the Zeiterion Theater Performing Arts Center in New Bedford, MA, Congregation Rodeph Shalom in Philadelphia, PA, The Museum of Jewish Heritage in Battery Park City, New York City, and Hofstra University in Hempstead, Long Island, NY.  The cast was Ed Asner, Johanna Day, Ned Eisenberg and Blair Baker under the direction of Pam Berlin.

In January and February 2019, "concert readings" of The Soap Myth were performed in Baltimore, Wilmington, New York City, Tenafly, NJ and Commack, NY with the following cast: Ed Asner, Tovah Feldshuh, Ned Eisenberg and Liba Vaynberg directed by Pam Berlin. In April and May 2019,The Soap Myth performed "concert readings" in Tampa, Sarasota, Wilmington, New York City, Hartford, Milwaukee, Indianapolis, St. Louis, Cleveland, Columbus and Pittsburgh directed by Pam Berlin with the following cast: Ed Asner, Tovah Feldshuh (Tampa, Sarasota, Wilmington, Hartford & New York City), Dee Pelletier (Milwaukee, Indianapolis, St. Louis, Cleveland, Columbus & Pittsburgh), Ned Eisenberg (all dates except for Hartford), Donald Corren (Hartford) and Liba Vaynberg.

On July 22, 2019, The Soap Myth was performed at the Williamstown Theatre Festival with Ed Asner, Tovah Feldshuh, Liba Vaynberg and Ned Eisenberg.  About that performance, Williamstown Artistic Director Mandy Greenfield wrote: "Many heartfelt thanks to you and to everyone involved in the reading of The Soap Myth on Monday. I can say with utter confidence that the audience was reached, moved and transformed by the piece and the performance of your text!. I’m grateful to all of you for making the journey to Williamstown and for giving your time and extraordinary talents to telling this story with such depth and intensity. It felt epic, historic, important and meaningful beyond words. Thank you again for an evening this Festival will not soon forget."

Description
The Soap Myth dramatizes the powerful confrontation between survivor memory and historical memory and depicts the insidiousness of anti-Semitism masquerading as Holocaust denial. More than a half century after World War II, a friendship develops between a young journalist and a cantankerous Holocaust survivor on a crusade to have the Nazi atrocity of "soap" displayed in Holocaust museums - did the Nazis make soap from the corpses of their murdered Jewish victims?  This critically acclaimed play grapples with several provocative themes including 'Who has the right to write history?' and 'How does a survivor survive surviving?'

Although The Soap Myth is a work of fiction, it is, in the words of the program, "inspired by real people and real events as well as an article written by Josh Rolnick in Moment magazine profiling Holocaust survivor Morris Spitzer."

Foremost among the play's historical inspirations is the evidence that the Nazi regime had a program at the Danzig Anatomic Institute in 1944 to develop a process for the mass-production of soap from the fat of Jews being slaughtered in Nazi extermination camps, and produced soap in small quantities at a nearby concentration camp. In a dramatic moment, the players re-enact testimony from the Nuremberg Trials, including this recipe:

5 kilos of human fat are mixed with 10 liters of water and 500 or 1,000 grams of caustic soda. All this is boiled 2 or 3 hours and then cooled. The soap floats to the surface while the water and other sediment remain at the bottom. A bit of salt and soda is added to this mixture. Then fresh water is added and the mixture again boiled 2 or 3 hours. After having cooled, the soap is poured into molds."

The play's central character, is an elderly Holocaust survivor called Milton Saltzman, worked doggedly to establish as fact the idea that the Nazis produced and used soap made from human corpses, even handing bars of such soap to Jews on their way into the sealed chambers that functioned alternately as gas chambers and as shower rooms in the Nazi concentration camps.

The second character is a young journalist called Annie Blumberg assigned to write a story about Saltzman. She is soon caught between her sympathies for Saltzman and the adamant stand of a number of distinguished scholars of the Holocaust who refuse to publish the Nazi manufacture of soap as fact despite a large amount of eyewitness testimony, including the eyewitness testimony of both Nazis and British prisoners of war at the Nuremberg trial who worked in the experimental soap manufacturing facility at Danzig in 1944, because contemporary documentation is lacking. The scholars in the play fear that without proof beyond the eyewitness testimony, the story of the manufacture of soap from human bodies will become ammunition in the hands of Holocaust deniers.

Two characters representing historians of the Holocaust argue strongly that although a large number of eyewitnesses including former British POWs, Nazis, and Holocaust survivors have testified about the soap production, because no actual laboratory or production records survive as physical documents, any publication about the production of soap will be used by Holocaust deniers to discredit the reality of the Holocaust itself and, therefore, that no assertions that any soap production took place should be published.

A character called Brenda Goodsen, an amalgam of a number of Holocaust deniers including David Irving, appears in the play to demonstrate the evil of anti-Semitism in the form of Holocaust Denial.  This character delivers a speech for minimizing the Holocaust and concluding that the Jews brought it on themselves.

Historical references
Holocaust historian Robert Melvin Spector concludes that the Nazis "did indeed use human fat for the making of soap at Stutthof," albeit in limited quantity.

The material in the Nuremberg Trial scenes in the play use as dialogue actual testimony given by British prisoners of war and by Nazis at the historical trials about the development of an industrial process for producing soap from human bodies at the Danzig Anatomic Institute, the production of such soap on a small-scale basis at Stutthof concentration camp, and the actual use of this soap by Nazi personnel.

Public reception
The play has gone through two substantially different versions. The first received a workshop production at South Street Seaport in July 2009.

The New York Times called the play a "pointed investigation of the politics of history."

Time Out New York wrote that the play "touches on a host of compelling issues: irrefutable versus empirical evidence, the subjective shaping of history, institutional agendas and, in its most effective scene, the potential seduction of anti-Semitism." But criticized the play's faulty dramaturgy.

NYTheater.com, praised its "...dazzling objectivity and even-handedness" and "real moral heft..."

The Villager found it compelling, "There are certain movies, plays, books that one wishes would never end. For me, The Soap Myth is one of those extraordinary plays."

Following the workshop production, the play was substantially rewritten and subsequently produced in March, 2012 by the National Jewish Theater Foundation Off Broadway at the Roundabout Theater's Harold & Mimi Steinberg Center Black Box Theater.  This production, directed by Arnold Mittelman, featured Greg Mullavey, Andi Potamkin, Donald Corren and Dee Pelletier.  Reviews of this production were uniformly positive.

The New York Times called the revised play "A revelation... frightening... thought-provoking... genuinely moving."

History News Network called it "An eye-opening history lesson... gut-wrenching... unforgettable."

The Philadelphia Jewish Voice said "Continues to haunt me... this is the theatre of witness at its best - provocative and morally ambiguous."

Film
On April 22, 2019, PBS flagship station WNET filmed a concert reading performance for broadcast on their All Arts channel, at the Center for Jewish History in New York.  The cast was Ed Asner, Tovah Feldshuh, Liba Vaynberg and Ned Eisenberg.

A film, directed by Ron Kopp and Mr. Mittelman, was made of the National Jewish Theater production.  That film was broadcast nationally through American Public Television on PBS stations across the country.  The sponsoring station, WPBT2 in Miami, broadcast the premiere on January 27, 2014.  In addition, the film was the first American offering on Britain's prestigious Digital Theatre website.

Ron Kopp also directed "I Will Refuse to Bubble: History and Theater as Defiance," a documentary about the making of "The Soap Myth" that examines the question of who has the right to write history, highlighting the importance of theater in understanding the world's most incomprehensible events. Featuring Holocaust survivor Irving Roth and scholars Michael Berenbaum, David Marwell and Bonnie Gurewitsch, it also is distributed online by Digital Theatre.

References

External links
The film's trailer
I Will Refuse to Bubble: History and Theatre as Defiance - available on Digital Theatre now
House Seats | The Soap Myth | Episode 4

2009 plays
Plays about the Holocaust
Off-Broadway plays
Plays based on actual events
American plays